Farhan Khan (born 3 March 1990) is a Pakistani first-class cricketer who played for Quetta cricket team.

References

External links
 

1990 births
Living people
Pakistani cricketers
Quetta cricketers
People from Mastung District